Wayne Johnston (born May 22, 1958) is a Canadian novelist. His fiction deals primarily with the province of Newfoundland and Labrador, often in a historical setting. In 2011 Johnston was awarded the Writers' Trust Engel/Findley Award in recognition of his overall contribution to Canadian Literature.

Biography
Johnston was May 22, 1958, born in Goulds, Newfoundland, and graduated from Memorial University of Newfoundland in 1978 with a degree in English literature. He worked for three years as a newspaper reporter with the St. John's Daily News. 

In 1981, he moved to Ottawa, and began to pursue writing full-time, in part by graduate work.  He graduated with an MA in English from the University of New Brunswick in 1984. His first novel, The Story of Bobby O'Malley—which was written while he was a graduate student—won him early critical notice, and the W.H. Smith/Books in Canada First Novel Award in 1985.  The novel was adapted for the stage in 2006 by J. M. Sullivan. 

His second novel, The Time of Their Lives, won the Air Canada/Canadian Authors Association Award for Most Promising Young Canadian Writer in 1988. His novel The Divine Ryans won the 1991 Thomas Head Raddall Award, and was subsequently adapted to the screen.  Academy Award nominated actor Pete Postlethwaite starred in the 1999 movie version of The Divine Ryans - Johnston wrote the screenplay, won best screenplay in the Atlantic Film Festival and was nominated for an Actra Award.

Johnston's breakthrough novel, 1998's The Colony of Unrequited Dreams - shortlisted for both the Giller Prize and the Governor General's Award for fiction - was acclaimed for its historical portrayal of legendary Newfoundland politician Joey Smallwood. It was featured on the first page of the New York Times Book Review when it was released in the United States, and was an international best seller.  The Colony of Unrequited Dreams won or was nominated for sixteen national and international awards, including the Commonwealth Prize and the Dublin Impac Prize.  It won the New York Public Libraries Prize for Best Novel and was chosen by the Los Angeles Times as one of the Ten Best Books of the year in 1999.  It is being adapted for the screen in an American-Australian-Canadian production.  

The novel was chosen for the 2003 edition of  CBC Radio's Canada Reads competition, where it was championed by notable politician Justin Trudeau, and won the People's Choice Award. 

Johnston's The Custodian of Paradise, published in 2006, told the story of Sheilagh Fielding, a fictional character originally introduced in Colony of Unrequited Dreams.

In 2002, Johnston published The Navigator of New York, a historical novel about the race by explorers to reach the North Pole; it was shortlisted for both the Giller Prize and the Governor General's Award for fiction.  A World Elsewhere, published in 2011, was a number one Canadian best seller.  Johnston was awarded the Writers' Trust Engel/Findley Award in recognition of his contribution to Canadian Literature in 2011.

On April 9, 2014, Johnston was shortlisted for the Stephen Leacock Memorial Medal for Humour in Canadian Literature for his novel The Son of a Certain Woman.

Non-fiction
Johnston has also published non-fiction: his Baltimore's Mansion (1999), is a memoir about his father and grandfather. It won the inaugural Charles Taylor Prize for literary non-fiction. Several of Johnston's books have been published in the United States, the United Kingdom, the Netherlands, Germany and China.

Academic appointments
For the spring of 2002, Johnston was the Writer-in-Residence at Hollins University in Roanoke, Virginia.  He returned to Hollins University in 2004 to fill the Distinguished Chair in Creative Writing, which he held till 2009. 

His convocation address to the University of Alberta was subsequently published as "The Old Lost Land of Newfoundland: Family, Memory, Fiction and Myth" (2009, 47 pages) in the Henry Kreisel Lecture Series. Johnston has delivered a number of other prominent lectures, including the John Adams lecture in Amsterdam.

Honours and awards
1998 New York Public Libraries Prize for Best Novel for The Colony of Unrequited Dreams
1999 Winner of The Charles Taylor Prize for Baltimore's Mansion
Johnston received a Doctor of Letters from the University of New Brunswick in 2003, and from Memorial University of Newfoundland in 2006.

Bibliography

Novels

 The Story of Bobby O'Malley (1985)
 The Time of Their Lives (1987)
 The Divine Ryans (1990)
 Human Amusements (1994)
 The Colony of Unrequited Dreams (1998, shortlisted for the Giller Prize and other awards; won the New York Public Libraries Prize for Best Novel)
 The Navigator of New York (2002, shortlisted for the Giller Prize and Governor General's Award for fiction) 
 The Custodian of Paradise (2006, longlisted for the Scotiabank Giller Prize)
 A World Elsewhere (2011, longlisted for the Scotiabank Giller Prize)
 The Son of a Certain Woman (2013, longlisted for the Scotiabank Giller Prize)
 First Snow, Last Light (2017)
 The Mystery of Right and Wrong (2021)

Memoir

 Baltimore's Mansion (1999 Winner of The Charles Taylor Prize)

 Jennie’s Boy (2022)

Short Stories

 Catechism (2005)
 The Montreal Canadiens (1996)

External links
 Author Biography
"Wayne Johnston", The Canadian Encyclopedia
 "Walter Johnston Interview", THE COMMENTARY.CA, November 2006

References

1958 births
Living people
Canadian historical novelists
Memorial University of Newfoundland alumni
Writers from Newfoundland and Labrador
Amazon.ca First Novel Award winners